"Heart on Fire" is a song recorded by American country music singer Eric Church. It was released on July 12, 2021, as second single from Church's studio album Heart. The song was written by Church, and produced by Jay Joyce.

Background
Church told the story behind the song in a press release: ""Heart On Fire" was the first song we recorded when we got to North Carolina, I already had pretty much, I wrote this song by myself, but I already had this song on the rails and we were heading down the path of what this was going to be. I thought we needed to kind of break the ice and get started on something, [...] This was the song that was kind of the icebreaker for the whole project, and I credit this song a lot for getting us to where we ended up getting to with the project."

Content
Website popculture.com described "Heart On Fire" as "an up-tempo, Southern rock-infused track looking back on a young love". The song quotes many classic rock songs, including "All Shook Up" (1957) by Elvis Presley, "American Pie" (1971) by Don McLean, "Paradise City" (1989) by Guns N' Roses and "New York Minute" (1990) by Don Henley.

Critical reception
Robyn Collins of Taste of Country opined that the track has "a jangly John Mellencamp kind of organic-feeling drive".

Charts

Weekly charts

Year-end charts

Release history

References

2021 singles
2021 songs
Eric Church songs
Songs written by Eric Church
Song recordings produced by Jay Joyce
EMI Records singles